Mark James Danks (born 8 February 1984) is an English footballer currently with Stourport Swifts.

He had previous professional experience with Bradford City in the 2002–03 season and won the FA Trophy with Hednesford Town in the 2003–04 season and also won the Conference League Cup with A.F.C. Telford United in the 2008–09 season.

Career

Football League
Danks began his career at Wolverhampton Wanderers, where he played for England U15 and U16, before joining Bradford City for a season in August 2002. Although restricted to four substitute appearances he scored his first goal in senior football in an FA Cup match against West Bromwich Albion, which Bradford lost 3–1.

Non-League career
He went to Halesowen Town of the Southern League Premier Division on a month loan in March 2003 where he scored on his debut at Ilkeston Town. He was released by Bradford City at the end of the 2002–03 season.

Danks joined Hednesford Town in July 2003 and went on to win the FA Trophy with them in 2004. He joined Conference National club Forest Green Rovers in August 2004, where he did not have the best of times, going out on loan for a month to Stafford Rangers in September 2004, on loan to Kettering Town in the Conference North in March 2005, on loan for two months to Bromsgrove Rovers in September 2005 and on loan for a month to Cirencester Town in December 2005.

He joined Worcester City on a non-contract basis and then signed a contract until the end of the 2007–08 season in March 2006.

In May 2008, Danks joined Halesowen Town.

In February 2009, Danks joined Conference North side Telford United on a contract until the end of the season. He scored a penalty in the Conference League Cup final against his former club, Forest Green, as Telford won the final 3–0 on penalties.

In June 2010 Danks re-signed for Conference North club Worcester City from Northwich Victoria.

On 18 June 2011 Danks rejoined Hednesford Town for the 2011–12 season. In January 2012 he joined Stourbridge on a non-contract basis, then Airbus UK Broughton later that month.

During the summer of 2012 he moved to Redditch United, being released in October, followed by an even shorter spell with Evesham United until November 2012. Also in November 2012 he joined Sutton Coldfield Town, scoring four times on his debut for Sutton Coldfield in a Doodson Sports Cup game against Loughborough Dynamo, and then scored the winning goal on his league debut on 1 December 2012 against Carlton Town.

In March 2014, he joined Halesowen Town, extending the deal in May 2014 to be committed for the 2014–15 campaign.

However, following a preseason game between Tamworth and Rushall Olympic on 2 August 2014, he signed for the latter. Following appearances for AFC Bridgnorth, Lye Town, and Hednesford Town for the third time, all during the autumn of 2014, and finally joined Chasetown in December 2014. In February 2015, he switched back to Sutton Coldfield Town for the remainder of the season, although he has a loan spell at Boldmere St. Michaels in March 2015. In May 2015, he agreed terms with The Royals to stay on for another season.

Only weeks into the 2015–16 season he moved to Tividale of the Northern Premier League Division One South. He left in February 2016 to join Romulus, and in October 2016 he rejoined Lye Town. He returned to Worcester City once more in July 2017, after a pre-season stint with Midland League Premier Division rivals Boldmere St. Michaels. In February 2018, he joined Worcester Raiders of the West Midlands (Regional) League Division One on dual registration terms, in order to gain match fitness. They reside in the 11th tier of the English football pyramid.

In June 2018, City manager John Snape revealed that Danks had turned down an offer to commit himself to them for the upcoming season, and instead moved to Black Country Rangers of West Midlands (Regional) League Premier Division. He eventually opted out of the deal to take the role as a player-assistant manager at City's league rivals Stourport Swifts.

Honours

Club
Hednesford Town
FA Trophy: 2003-04
AFC Telford United
Conference League Cup: 2008–09

Individual
2009–10 FA Cup Player of the Round: First Qualifying Round

References

External links

Mark Danks 2002–03 stats, SoccerFactsUK.
Mark Danks 2003–04 stats, SoccerFactsUK.
Mark Danks 2004–05 stats, SoccerFactsUK.
Mark Danks 2005–06 stats, SoccerFactsUK.
Mark Danks 2006–07 stats, SoccerFactsUK.
Mark Danks 2007–08 stats, SoccerFactsUK.

1984 births
Living people
People from Warley, West Midlands
English footballers
Association football forwards
Wolverhampton Wanderers F.C. players
Bradford City A.F.C. players
Halesowen Town F.C. players
Hednesford Town F.C. players
Forest Green Rovers F.C. players
Stafford Rangers F.C. players
Kettering Town F.C. players
Bromsgrove Rovers F.C. players
Cirencester Town F.C. players
Worcester City F.C. players
AFC Telford United players
Northwich Victoria F.C. players
Stourbridge F.C. players
Airbus UK Broughton F.C. players
Redditch United F.C. players
Evesham United F.C. players
Sutton Coldfield Town F.C. players
Rushall Olympic F.C. players
A.F.C. Bridgnorth players
Lye Town F.C. players
Chasetown F.C. players
Boldmere St. Michaels F.C. players
Tividale F.C. players
Romulus F.C. players
English Football League players
Cymru Premier players